Marcelo Daniel Tapia Amarillo (born September 26, 1992, in Montevideo, Uruguay) is a Uruguayan footballer who is currently unattached.

Career
After a career spent in the lower leagues of his native Uruguay, on 1 February 2022 Tapia moved to Italy to sign for Serie D club Lavello.

References

External links
 
 
 Profile at Tenfield Digital 

1992 births
Living people
Uruguayan footballers
C.A. Progreso players
Association football midfielders